James Street is a street which serves the Perth suburbs Perth and Northbridge. It is the main east-west road in the centre of Northbridge.

A section of the eastern end of the street has been closed and modified as the James Street Mall in the  Perth Cultural Centrewith the Western Australian Museum, Alexander Library Building and older government buildings contained within the culture centre area.

The central section between William Street and to the western end at Russell Square is a streetscape with a colourful and extensive history of crime, and notoriety.

Until December 2016, the Mitchell Freeway had a southbound exit onto the street. The exit was removed and replaced with one at Roe Street to enable the construction of the Charles Street Bus Bridge.

Intersections

Notes

 
Streets in Northbridge, Western Australia